Manuel Arturo Izquierdo Peña is a Colombian anthropologist who has contributed to the knowledge of the Muisca and other pre-Columbian cultures, among others San Agustín, Colombia. His main work has been on archaeoastronomy of the Muisca calendar.

Biography 
Izquierdo Peña obtained his degree in anthropology from the Universidad Nacional de Colombia in 1997 and published his thesis titled Prospección arqueoastronómica en la cultura de San Agustín ("Archeoastronomical prospection in the San Agustín culture") in 1998.

In 2008 he published his MSc. thesis at the Université de Montréal titled The Muisca Calendar: An approximation to the timekeeping system of the ancient native people of the northeastern Andes of Colombia in which he analyzed the Muisca calendar, a complex lunisolar calendar used by the Muisca of the Altiplano Cundiboyacense. In this publication and later work Izquierdo Peña analyzed the work by Muisca scholars José Domingo Duquesne, Alexander von Humboldt, Vicente Restrepo and Pedro Simón on the Muisca calendar. He also described the Choachí Stone, a rock art pice found in the village of Choachí in the 1940s that functioned as a calculator for the use of the complex calendar.

Publications 
 2014 - Calendario Muisca ("Muisca calendar")
 2009 - The Muisca Calendar: An approximation to the timekeeping system of the ancient native people of the northeastern Andes of Colombia
 2001 - Astronomia para Todos ("Astronomy for everyone")
 2000 - Arqueoastronomia en Colombia ("Archeoastronomy in Colombia")
 1999 - Los Astrónomos de Piedra ("The rocky astronomers")
 1998 - Sistema de simulacion de Paisajes para Arqueoastronomia ("Simulation system of landscapes for archeoastronomy")

See also 

Archaeoastronomy
List of Muisca scholars
Muisca astronomy, calendar
El Infiernito, Carl Henrik Langebaek
Liborio Zerda
José Domingo Duquesne

References

Bibliography 
 
 

Colombian astronomers
Colombian anthropologists
21st-century anthropologists
Archaeoastronomers
Muisca scholars
Living people
National University of Colombia alumni
Université de Montréal alumni
Year of birth missing (living people)